Lizelia Augusta Jenkins Moorer (September 1868 - May 24, 1936) was a poet and teacher in Orangeburg, South Carolina.

Biography
She taught at the Normal and Grammar Schools, Claflin University, Orangeburg, South Carolina from 1895 to 1899. In 1907, she published a collection of poems, "Prejudice Unveiled and Other Poems". English Professor Joan R. Sherman described Moorer's poems as the "best poems on racial issues written by any black woman until the middle of the century." Moorer attacks "lynching, debt peonage, white rape, Jim Crow segregation, and the hypocrisy of the church and the white press".

Moorer was born in September 1868 to Warren D. Jenkins and Mattie Miller in Pickens, South Carolina. In 1899, she married Jacob Moorer, an attorney in Orangeburg who frequently saw cases defending the rights of blacks against what he saw as a prejudiced legal system in South Carolina. In particular, he fought against the constitutionality of election law in the 1895 South Carolina Constitution. Lizelia was also a very strong activist. Beyond her poetry, she was active in the Woman's Christian Temperance Union, serving as State Vice-President in South Carolina in 1910. In 1924, she attended the 1924 Methodist Episcopal Church General Conference where she gave a speech arguing that women should be allowed to be ordained within the Methodist Church. During that conference, women were, indeed, given the right to be ordained as local deacons and elders.

References

Bibliography
 Moorer, Lizelia Augusta Jenkins. Prejudice unveiled : and other poems, Boston: Roxburgh Publishing Company, 1907, available at http://name.umdl.umich.edu/BAR7158.0001.001

1868 births
1936 deaths
20th-century American poets
20th-century American women writers
African-American Methodists
African-American poets
People from Orangeburg, South Carolina
Poets from South Carolina
People from Pickens, South Carolina
20th-century African-American women writers
20th-century African-American writers